Countess Margit Sztaray de Nagymihaly (born 1859) was a Polish composer who is best known today for her choral arrangement of Ave Maria. 

Sztaray was the daughter of Ferdinand Sztaray de Sztara et Nagymihaly and Gabriella Vecsey de Hernadvecs et Hajnacskeo. She spent some time at the Vienna Conservatory around 1900, possibly as a teacher. She wrote songs, as well as sacred music with organ accompaniment, which were published by Feuchtinger & Gleichauf of Regensburg, Germany. Her publications include:

Ave Maria (four women’s voices and organ) 

Katholische Kirchen-Gesange (Catholic Church Chants)

References 

Polish composers
Polish women composers
1859 births
Year of death missing